Tepalcates is a station on the Line A of the Mexico City Metro.  It is located in the Iztapalapa municipality, to the east of downtown Mexico City. In 2019, the station had an average ridership of 19,326 passengers per day.

Name and pictogram
The station takes its name from the nearby estate Unidad Habitacional Tepalcates. The name has its roots in the Nahuatl word "teplacatl" used to refer to any pot or vessel made out of clay or mud. The pictogram depicts the side view of a pre-Hispanic pottery bowl of the types made in Puebla and Tlaxcala.

General information
The station was opened on 12 August 1991 along the other nine stations of Line A.

Metro Tepalcates connects with the bus rapid transit stop of the same name of the Mexico City Metrobús Line 2; this stop is the eastern terminus of Line 2.

As every Line A station, except for Pantitlán, it is an at grade station in the median of Calzada Ignacio Zaragoza with the entrances on both sides of the road connecting to the station through two pedestrian bridges. Due to the design of the station, it has an island platform where passengers can take trains in both eastbound and westbound directions.

Ridership

Exits
North: Calzada Ignacio Zaragoza and General Esteban Baca Calderón street, Colonia Juan Escutia
South: Calzada Ignacio Zaragoza and Avenida Telecomunicaciones, Unidad Habitacional Tepalcates

Station layout

Gallery

References

External links

Mexico City Metro stations in Iztapalapa
Mexico City Metro Line A stations
Railway stations opened in 1991
1991 establishments in Mexico
Accessible Mexico City Metro stations